Charles Hislop Boyce (6 January 1899 – 6 August 1964) was a Scottish amateur football inside right who played in the Scottish Football League for Queen's Park.

Personal life 
Boyce served as a lieutenant in the Royal Engineers during the First World War and was honourably discharged due to wounds or sickness in 1916. After the war, he worked as a Civil Defence Engineer for the Glasgow Corporation.

Career statistics

References 

Scottish footballers
Scottish Football League players
Queen's Park F.C. players
Footballers from Glasgow
People from Cathcart
1899 births
1964 deaths
Royal Engineers officers
British Army personnel of World War I
Association football inside forwards